Pingyangmiao Township is an rural township in You County, Zhuzhou City, Hunan Province, People's Republic of China.

Cityscape
The township is divided into 11 villages, the following areas: Lianhe Village, Ningjiaping Village, Longwang Village, Pingshuang Village, Pingtang Village, Pingtai Village, Shuangsong Village, Shuangfan Village, Longquan Village, Biwu Village, and Huanggong Village.

References

Historic township-level divisions of You County